The following railroads have operated in the State of Alabama.

Class I Railroads
BNSF Railway (BNSF)
Canadian National Railway (CN) through its subsidiary Illinois Central Railroad (IC)
CSX Transportation (CSXT)
Norfolk Southern Railway (NS) including its subsidiaries Alabama Great Southern Railroad (AGS) and Central of Georgia Railroad (CG)

Regional Railroads
Alabama and Gulf Coast Railway (AGR)

Shortline and Terminal Railroads
Alabama and Tennessee River Railway (ATN)
Alabama Southern Railroad (ABS)
Alabama Warrior Railway (ABWR)
Autauga Northern Railroad (AUT)
Bay Line Railroad (BAYL)
Birmingham Terminal Railway (BHRR)
CG Railway (CGR)
Columbus and Chattahoochee Railroad (CCH)
Conecuh Valley Railroad (COEH)
Eastern Alabama Railway (EARY)
Georgia Southwestern Railroad (GSWR)
Huntsville and Madison County Railroad Authority (HMCR)
Luxapalila Valley Railroad (LXVR)
Meridian and Bigbee Railroad (MNBR)
Mississippi Central Railroad (MSCI)
Sequatchie Valley Railroad (SQVR)
Tennessee Southern Railroad (TSRR)
Terminal Railway Alabama State Docks (TASD)
Three Notch Railroad (TNHR)
Wiregrass Central Railroad (WGCR)

Commuter Railroads
Amtrak (AMTK): The Crescent

Heritage and Scenic Railroads
North Alabama Railroad Museum (Mercury and Chase Railroad)
Heart of Dixie Railroad Museum (Calera and Shelby Railroad)

Industrial Rail Operations
Rapid Switching Services (switching at Kerr-McGee at Mobile)
Southern Electric Railroad (Southern Company plants)

Defunct railroads

Electric railways
Birmingham and Edgewood Electric Railway
Birmingham Railway and Electric Company
Birmingham Street Railway
Birmingham–Tuscaloosa Railway and Utilities Company
Metropolitan Rapid Transit, Light and Power Company

Notes

References
 
 
Association of American Railroads (2003),  . Retrieved August 16, 2005
Worker's of the Writer's Program of the Works Progress Administration in the State of Alabama(1941) Alabama: A Guide to the Deep South. American Guide Series. (New York: R. R. Smith)

Alabama
 
 
Railroads